Nicolás David Rossi Marachlian (born 21 March 2002) is a Uruguayan professional footballer who plays as a left-winger for Peñarol.

Club career
Rossi is a youth academy graduate of Peñarol. He made his professional debut for the club on 25 November 2021 in a goalless league draw against Progreso. In August 2022, he extended his contract with the club until December 2025.

International career
In August 2020, Rossi received call-up from Armenia under-19 team to take part in a training camp.

Personal life
Born in Uruguay, Rossi is of Armenian descent through his mother's family and Italian through his father's. His elder brother Diego Rossi is a current Uruguay national team player.

Career statistics

Honours
Peñarol
 Uruguayan Primera División: 2021

Peñarol U20
U-20 Copa Libertadores: 2022

References

External links
 

2002 births
Living people
Footballers from Montevideo
Uruguayan people of Armenian descent
Association football midfielders
Uruguayan footballers
Uruguayan Primera División players
Peñarol players